The tornado outbreak of October 17–19, 2007 was a widespread tornado outbreak that took place across much of the eastern half of North America starting on October 17, 2007, and continuing into the early hours of October 19. The outbreak was also responsible for five deaths; three in Michigan and two in Missouri, plus many injuries (including some from non-tornadic events). At least 64 tornadoes were confirmed including 16 on October 17 across six states including Texas, Oklahoma, Arkansas, Louisiana, Mississippi and Missouri with wind damage reported in Oklahoma, Kansas, Illinois, Iowa, Arkansas and Mississippi. On October 18, at least 48 tornadoes were confirmed across eight states including Florida, Alabama, Mississippi, Tennessee, Kentucky, Illinois, Indiana and Michigan, plus widespread straight line wind damage. Until 2010, this event held the record for largest tornado outbreak ever recorded in the month of October according to NOAA.

Meteorological synopsis

A deep low pressure system (with a pressure of 977 mbar at its peak) moved across the Pacific Coast on October 15 and then crossed the Rockies during the following day and touched out some moist air from the Gulf of Mexico, a major source for storm development and intensification. Not part of the main outbreak, 3 tornadoes were reported, during the overnight hours of October 16 towards October 17, across Randall County, Texas south of Amarillo on October 16 with one of them confirmed as a high-end EF1; that tornado caused damage to trees, fences, power poles, steel pipes, trailers, and barns.

The next day, a dry line, which separates the drier air from the more moist and humid air, formed ahead of the cold front across the Texas and Oklahoma Panhandles and tracked eastward. The high humidity levels with dew points in the 70s°F (low 20s°C), temperatures that in many areas were near 80 °F (27 °C), strong wind shear, and the presence of the dry line helped develop the instability to produce severe thunderstorms across both the Midwest and the Southern Plains on October 17.

A moderate risk for severe weather was issued by the Storm Prediction Center two days prior to the event. The storm then moved across the most of the Midwest on October 18, where a moderate risk was in effect also for two days for most of Illinois, Indiana, and parts of Kentucky; however, the moderate risk was revised further to the south and the east to include western Ohio, western Tennessee, southeastern Missouri, northeastern Arkansas, and a larger portion of Kentucky. Both Michigan and Wisconsin were no longer under a moderate risk. A slight risk of severe weather was forecast for a large area from beyond the Canada–US border to the Florida Panhandle and the Mobile Bay area. Dew points above 70 °F (21 °C) were reported well into the Ohio Valley, and those over 60 °F (16 °C) were reported as far north as northern Ontario.

The outbreak was expected to continue into October 19 east of the Appalachian Mountains, but extensive cloud cover prevented any significant severe storms from developing; even though, several wind reports were reported in Pennsylvania, New Jersey, and Massachusetts. The storm then moved out into the Atlantic Ocean on October 20.

Tornadoes confirmed

October 17 event

October 18 event

Significant tornadoes

The first severe thunderstorms developed during the early morning of October 17 across much of northern and eastern Texas and parts of Oklahoma and Kansas with only one reported tornado in east Texas. Several severe thunderstorms then later developed across eastern Oklahoma, Arkansas, Louisiana, western Mississippi, eastern Kansas, Missouri and parts of Nebraska, Iowa, Kentucky, Illinois and Tennessee. Twelve additional tornadoes were reported in Missouri and Louisiana during the late afternoon and early evening with damage reported in Lawrence and Greene counties in Missouri. One of the tornadoes located near Verona destroyed several barns and homes but did not cause any injuries and was later confirmed as an EF2. The storms persisted throughout the night and an additional tornado killed 2 people inside a mobile home in Greene County, Missouri, near Paris.

On October 18, several thunderstorms already developed during the morning hours and continued to intensify during the afternoon. Just after 11:00 am EDT, one tornado in downtown Pensacola, Florida, caused some extensive damage to the roof of a Baptist church as well as portions of Cordova Mall, but there were no reported injuries at the church and daycare center. During the early evenings severe weather affected the Louisville, Kentucky Metro area in which tree damage and power outages were reported throughout the area and a possible tornado at around 7:00 pm EDT near the Crescent Hill area which was later confirmed as a brief EF0. Still in the region, one tree fell over a passing car but the motorist escaped injuries although he was trapped for several minutes inside. The Louisville power authority the LG&E reported as much as 2,500 homes without power mostly in St. Matthews and Crescent Hill areas. More storms rolled through much of the Ohio and Tennessee Valleys during the second half of the evening and overnight with more storms in Michigan.

Areas the hardest hit were along and near the Ohio River in western Kentucky  as well as central and northern Indiana in Nappanee where injuries were reported as well as significant damage, and in Central Michigan. Three people were killed overall on October 18: one in Kalkaska County, Michigan and two in Locke Township, near Williamston, Michigan. In addition to the tornadoes, storm straight-line damaging winds measured up to 80 mph (130 km/h) were recorded across several of the regions hit by the severe weather, causing extensive tree and power line downings with isolated reports of structural damage.

His parents told reporters that the mattress saved the toddler's life and he suffered few to no injuries.
According to the National Weather Service in Detroit, tornadoes this late in the year in Michigan are rare. The last significant October tornado event was on October 24, 2001, when three tornadoes hit southeastern Lower Michigan, out of a total of nine in the state that day. Including the 2001 tornadoes, only seven October tornadoes had been recorded in the NWS Detroit county warning area prior to the 2007 outbreak.  By comparison, NWS Detroit had confirmed five tornadoes in its coverage area from this outbreak. It was also the largest October outbreak over western Kentucky and southern Indiana as 15 tornadoes were confirmed on October 18.  Previous to this outbreak, only 19 tornadoes had been recorded in that same region during the history of October prior to this event. The Owensboro tornado, which was rated an EF3 was also the strongest ever in that month over the same region since records were kept in 1950 although an unofficial F3 took place in Posey County, Indiana on October 16, 1928.

Non-tornadic events

In addition to the tornadoes, widespread straight-line wind damage took place across much of the affected region, particularly on the night of October 17 as a result of a derecho that moved across the southern Great Plains into the Ozarks. Winds were reported as high as 100 mph (160 km/h) as a result of the bow echo that moved across the region. Tulsa was hard hit, with at least 55 people injured (one critically) due to wind damage at the Oktoberfest event. Many  mobile homes were destroyed, and widespread power outages were reported in the region including in Rogers County near Oologah where five people where injured. 

In Kansas, a bow echo caused some localized significant damage in and around the Wichita Metropolitan Area with the most significant damage at the International Cold Storage located in the Andover area where the peak winds were measured. Overall, over 400 wind reports in the US alone, were reported on both October 17 and 18 across the Midwest, Gulf Coast and Great Lakes with several reports of damage but there were no direct non-tornadic fatalities. In Chicago, an eleven-year-old boy was struck and injured by lightning while another person was injured by broken glass when high winds broke windows of a lobby hall of a condominium.

In addition, the Gulf Coast region, particularly the Florida Panhandle, received torrential rain due to continuous thunderstorms ahead of the cold front. Rainfall amounts over 12 inches (300 mm) were common (with amounts as high as 22 inches (560 mm) were reported in Gulf Breeze, Florida), although only minor flooding was reported including roads and some houses flooded.

See also
 List of North American tornadoes and tornado outbreaks
 Tornadoes of 2007
 2016 Pensacola Tornado

References

External links
 NWS Tulsa, Oklahoma storm summary
 NWS Paducah, Kentucky storm summary
 Storm Reports from NWS Paducah, Kentucky
 NWS Chicago, Illinois storm summary
 NWS Central Illinois storm summary
 Images of damage associated with the Nappanee, Indiana EF3 tornado (NWS Northern Indiana)
 Storm Damage Images in the Louisville area in surroundings (WLKY 32 in Louisville, Kentucky)

F3 tornadoes
Tornadoes of 2007
Tornadoes in Alabama
Tornadoes in Florida
Tornadoes in Indiana
Tornadoes in Kentucky
Tornadoes in Michigan
Tornadoes in Missouri
Derechos in the United States
2007 natural disasters in the United States
October 2007 events in the United States